Tüpraş Batman Oil Refinery is an oil refinery in Batman, southeastern Turkey. It is owned and operated by Tüpraş, the country's only oil refiner with four refineries.

Batman Oil Refinery is situated in downtown Batman. It became operational in 1955. The facility has an annual crude oil refining capacity of 1.1 million tonnes. It has the advantage of proximity to the domestic oil fields. It has a simple configuration due to lack of refining units. Intermediate goods are sent to the refineries in Izmir and kırıkkale by road transportation for further processing. In 2016, 1.0 million tonnes of asphalt base were produced, being an all-time record. The storage capacity of the refinery is 253,000 tonnes. The facility has a Nelson complexity index of 1.83. 463 personnel are employed in the facility.

References

Oil refineries in Turkey
Buildings and structures in Batman Province
Industrial buildings completed in 1955
Batman
Batman, Turkey
1955 establishments in Turkey